Happy Merry-Go-Round is a long-running Soviet and Russian animated anthology series created by Anatoly Petrov and Galina Barinova for Soyuzmultfilm in 1969. It is presented as a collection of 2–4 experimental shorts by various young directors. The original series ran from 1969 to 2001 and was released theatrically during the Soviet days and on television in the Russian Federation. 2012 saw the revival of the series.

History
The idea of the animated "newsreel" anthology (or a "children's animated magazine" as it was known in the Soviet Union) came to Anatoly Petrov and his wife Galina Barinova, both experienced animators at Soyuzmultfilm who hadn't been given a chance to direct their own films before. It was conceived as a proving ground for experimental animation by beginning directors based on riddles, rhymes, songs, absurd stories and so on.

The series aired in 1969 as a collection of four short traditionally animated cartoons by a team of newcomers, originally under the "artistic guidance" by Roman Kachanov. The first episode included Distracted Giovanni by Petrov, a hand-drawn story with a cutout look about a distracted boy who literally fell apart; Mosaic directed by Galina Barinova and Leonid Nosyrev that utilized a mosaic aesthetics; Antoshka, a musical comedy also by Nosyrev, and Well, Just You Wait! by Gennady Sokolsky which was soon turned into a popular series of its own.

Despite heavy criticism from the head of Goskino for "using children's cinema as a proving ground for abstract art", the anthology got a lot of praise on its release, and the team continued the production, attracting new people. Among those who made their directional debut in Happy Merry-Go-Round were Eduard Nazarov, Valery Ugarov, Garri Bardin, Aleksandr Davydov and others. They were given a lot of artistic freedom which allowed many of them to develop distinctive styles before departing to their own projects.

The first ten episodes were released theatrically from 1969 to 1978 on a yearly bases. Each episode was 9 months in production. While not directly connected, the segments still tried to follow a basic "comics" pattern and were developed collectively. After 1978 the original team left the project and it turned into a more traditional collection of cartoons, with each segment being developed independently from the rest. Episodes started appearing randomly: sometimes 2-3 per year, sometimes with a 1-2 year interval. Several stop motion shorts were introduced during the 1980s.

It was one of the few Soyuzmultfilm's projects that survived the dissolution of the Soviet Union and the following crisis, switching to the television format. The original series ran for 33 seasons up until 2001 when the production was stopped. In 2012 the series was revived. New directors and new types of animation were introduced, such as claymation, 2D and 3D computer animation.

List of episodes

See also
 History of Russian animation

References

External links
 
 Happy Merry-Go-Round at Animator.ru (in Russian)
 Episodes 1-32 at the licensed Youtube channel
 New episodes at the official Soyuzmultfilm Youtube channel
 Happy Merry-Go-Round Brotherhood documentary at the Suzdalfest channel (in Russian)

Russian children's animated anthology television series
Soviet animated television series
Soyuzmultfilm